New Ross was a United Kingdom Parliament constituency in Ireland, returning one Member of Parliament (MP). It was an original constituency represented in Parliament when the Union of Great Britain and Ireland took effect on 1 January 1801.

Boundaries
This constituency was the parliamentary borough of New Ross in County Wexford.

Members of Parliament
The use of Roman numerals in brackets is to distinguish between two MPs with the same name. It is not suggested that they were known in that way during their lifetimes.

Elections

Elections in the 1830s

Tottenham resigned, causing a by-election.

Elections in the 1840s

Elections in the 1850s

Duffy resigned by accepting the role of Steward of the Chiltern Hundreds, causing a by-election.

Elections in the 1860s
Tottenham resigned, causing a by-election.

Elections in the 1870s

Dunbar's death caused a by-election.

Elections in the 1880s

Foley resigned, causing a by-election.

References

The Parliaments of England by Henry Stooks Smith (1st edition published in three volumes 1844–50), 2nd edition edited (in one volume) by F.W.S. Craig (Political Reference Publications 1973)

Westminster constituencies in County Wexford (historic)
Constituencies of the Parliament of the United Kingdom established in 1801
Constituencies of the Parliament of the United Kingdom disestablished in 1885
New Ross